In linear algebra, eigendecomposition is the factorization of a matrix into a canonical form, whereby the matrix is represented in terms of its eigenvalues and eigenvectors. Only diagonalizable matrices can be factorized in this way. When the matrix being factorized is a normal or real symmetric matrix, the decomposition is called "spectral decomposition", derived from the spectral theorem.

Fundamental theory of matrix eigenvectors and eigenvalues 

A (nonzero) vector  of dimension  is an eigenvector of a square  matrix  if it satisfies a linear equation of the form

for some scalar . The above equation is called the eigenvalue equation or the eigenvalue problem.

This yields an equation for the eigenvalues

We call  the characteristic polynomial, and the equation, called the characteristic equation, is an th order polynomial equation in the unknown . This equation will have  distinct solutions, where .

If the field of scalars is algebraically closed, then we can factor  as

The integer  is termed the algebraic multiplicity of eigenvalue . The algebraic multiplicities sum to : 

For each eigenvalue , we have a specific eigenvalue equation

There will be  linearly independent solutions to each eigenvalue equation. The linear combinations of the  solutions (except the one which gives the zero vector) are the eigenvectors associated with the eigenvalue . It is important to keep in mind that the algebraic multiplicity  and geometric multiplicity  may or may not be equal, but we always have . The simplest case is of course when . The total number of linearly independent eigenvectors, can be calculated by summing the geometric multiplicities

The eigenvectors can be indexed by eigenvalues, using a double index, with  being the th eigenvector for the th eigenvalue.

Eigendecomposition of a matrix 

Let  be a square  matrix with  linearly independent eigenvectors  (where ).  Then  can be factorized as

Note that only diagonalizable matrices can be factorized in this way. For example, the defective matrix  (which is a shear matrix) cannot be diagonalized.

The  eigenvectors  are usually normalized, but they need not be. One special case is that if  is a normal matrix, then by the spectral theorem, it's always possible to diagonalize  in an orthonormal basis .

The decomposition can be derived from the fundamental property of eigenvectors:

The number of linearly independent eigenvectors  with nonzero eigenvalues is equal to the rank of the matrix , and also the dimension of the image (or range) of the corresponding matrix transformation, as well as its column space.

The linearly independent eigenvectors  with an eigenvalue of zero form a basis (which can be chosen to be orthonormal) for the null space (also known as the kernel) of the matrix transformation .

Example 

The 2 × 2 real matrix 

may be decomposed into a diagonal matrix through multiplication of a non-singular matrix 

Then
 
for some real diagonal matrix .

Multiplying both sides of the equation on the left by :

 

The above equation can be decomposed into two simultaneous equations:

 

Factoring out the eigenvalues  and :
 

Letting

this gives us two vector equations:

 

And can be represented by a single vector equation involving two solutions as eigenvalues:
 

Shifting  to the left hand side and factoring  out
 

Since  is non-singular, it is essential that  is nonzero. Therefore,
 

Thus
 

Putting the solutions back into the above simultaneous equations
 

Solving the equations, we have

that is:

Matrix inverse via eigendecomposition 

If a matrix  can be eigendecomposed and if none of its eigenvalues are zero, then  is invertible and its inverse is given by

Furthermore, because  is a diagonal matrix, its inverse is easy to calculate:

Practical implications 

When eigendecomposition is used on a matrix of measured, real data, the inverse may be less valid when all eigenvalues are used unmodified in the form above. This is because as eigenvalues become relatively small, their contribution to the inversion is large.  Those near zero or at the "noise" of the measurement system will have undue influence and could hamper solutions (detection) using the inverse.

Two mitigations have been proposed: truncating small or zero eigenvalues, and extending the lowest reliable eigenvalue to those below it.  See also Tikhonov regularization as a statistically motivated but biased method for rolling off eigenvalues as they become dominated by noise.

The first mitigation method is similar to a sparse sample of the original matrix, removing components that are not considered valuable.  However, if the solution or detection process is near the noise level, truncating may remove components that influence the desired solution.

The second mitigation extends the eigenvalue so that lower values have much less influence over inversion, but do still contribute, such that solutions near the noise will still be found.

The reliable eigenvalue can be found by assuming that eigenvalues of extremely similar and low value are a good representation of measurement noise (which is assumed low for most systems).

If the eigenvalues are rank-sorted by value, then the reliable eigenvalue can be found by minimization of the Laplacian of the sorted eigenvalues:

The position of the minimization is the lowest reliable eigenvalue. In measurement systems, the square root of this reliable eigenvalue is the average noise over the components of the system.

Functional calculus 

The eigendecomposition allows for much easier computation of power series of matrices. If  is given by

then we know that

Therefore, calculating  reduces to just calculating the function on each of the eigenvalues.

A similar technique works more generally with the holomorphic functional calculus, using

from above. Once again, we find that

Examples 

which are examples for the functions . Furthermore,  is the matrix exponential.

Decomposition for special matrices 

When  is normal or real symmetric matrix, the decomposition is called "spectral decomposition", derived from the spectral theorem.

Normal matrices 
A complex-valued square matrix   is normal (meaning , where  is the conjugate transpose) if and only if it can be decomposed as

If  is restricted to be a Hermitian matrix, then  has only real valued entries. If  is restricted to a unitary matrix, then  takes all its values on the complex unit circle, that is, .

Real symmetric matrices 

As a special case, for every  real symmetric matrix, the eigenvalues are real and the eigenvectors can be chosen real and orthonormal. Thus a real symmetric matrix  can be decomposed as

Useful facts

Useful facts regarding eigenvalues 
The product of the eigenvalues is equal to the determinant of   Note that each eigenvalue is raised to the power , the algebraic multiplicity.

Useful facts regarding eigenvectors 
 If  is Hermitian and full-rank, the basis of eigenvectors may be chosen to be mutually orthogonal. The eigenvalues are real.
 Eigenvectors are only defined up to a multiplicative constant. That is, if  then  is also an eigenvector for any scalar .
 In the case of degenerate eigenvalues (an eigenvalue having more than one eigenvector), the eigenvectors have an additional freedom of linear transformation, that is to say, any linear (orthonormal) combination of eigenvectors sharing an eigenvalue (in the degenerate subspace) is itself an eigenvector (in the subspace).

Useful facts regarding eigendecomposition 

  can be eigendecomposed if and only if the number of linearly independent eigenvectors, equals the dimension of an eigenvector: 
 If the field of scalars is algebraically closed and if  has no repeated roots, that is, if  then  can be eigendecomposed.
 The statement " can be eigendecomposed" does not imply that  has an inverse as some eigenvalues may be zero, which is not invertible.
 The statement " has an inverse" does not imply that  can be eigendecomposed.

Useful facts regarding matrix inverse 

  can be inverted if and only if all eigenvalues are nonzero: 

Numerical computations

Numerical computation of eigenvalues 

Suppose that we want to compute the eigenvalues of a given matrix. If the matrix is small, we can compute them symbolically using the characteristic polynomial. However, this is often impossible for larger matrices, in which case we must use a numerical method.

In practice, eigenvalues of large matrices are not computed using the characteristic polynomial. Computing the polynomial becomes expensive in itself, and exact (symbolic) roots of a high-degree polynomial can be difficult to compute and express: the Abel–Ruffini theorem implies that the roots of high-degree (5 or above) polynomials cannot in general be expressed simply using th roots. Therefore, general algorithms to find eigenvectors and eigenvalues are iterative.

Iterative numerical algorithms for approximating roots of polynomials exist, such as Newton's method, but in general it is impractical to compute the characteristic polynomial and then apply these methods.  One reason is that small round-off errors in the coefficients of the characteristic polynomial can lead to large errors in the eigenvalues and eigenvectors: the roots are an extremely ill-conditioned function of the coefficients.

A simple and accurate iterative method is the power method: a random vector  is chosen and a sequence of unit vectors is computed as
 

This sequence will almost always converge to an eigenvector corresponding to the eigenvalue of greatest magnitude, provided that  has a nonzero component of this eigenvector in the eigenvector basis (and also provided that there is only one eigenvalue of greatest magnitude). This simple algorithm is useful in some practical applications; for example, Google uses it to calculate the page rank of documents in their search engine.  Also, the power method is the starting point for many more sophisticated algorithms.  For instance, by keeping not just the last vector in the sequence, but instead looking at the span of all the vectors in the sequence, one can get a better (faster converging) approximation for the eigenvector, and this idea is the basis of Arnoldi iteration.  Alternatively, the important QR algorithm is also based on a subtle transformation of a power method.

Numerical computation of eigenvectors 

Once the eigenvalues are computed, the eigenvectors could be calculated by solving the equation

using Gaussian elimination or any other method for solving matrix equations.

However, in practical large-scale eigenvalue methods, the eigenvectors are usually computed in other ways, as a byproduct of the eigenvalue computation.  In power iteration, for example, the eigenvector is actually computed before the eigenvalue (which is typically computed by the Rayleigh quotient of the eigenvector).  In the QR algorithm for a Hermitian matrix (or any normal matrix), the orthonormal eigenvectors are obtained as a product of the  matrices from the steps in the algorithm.  (For more general matrices, the QR algorithm yields the Schur decomposition first, from which the eigenvectors can be obtained by a backsubstitution procedure.)  For Hermitian matrices, the Divide-and-conquer eigenvalue algorithm is more efficient than the QR algorithm if both eigenvectors and eigenvalues are desired.

Additional topics

Generalized eigenspaces 
The algebraic multiplicity can also be thought of as a dimension: it is the dimension of the associated generalized eigenspace (1st sense), which is the nullspace of the matrix  for any sufficiently large . That is, it is the space of generalized eigenvectors (first sense), where a generalized eigenvector is any vector which eventually becomes 0 if  is applied to it enough times successively. Any eigenvector is a generalized eigenvector, and so each eigenspace is contained in the associated generalized eigenspace. This provides an easy proof that the geometric multiplicity is always less than or equal to the algebraic multiplicity.

This usage should not be confused with the generalized eigenvalue problem described below.

Conjugate eigenvector 
A conjugate eigenvector or coneigenvector is a vector sent after transformation to a scalar multiple of its conjugate, where the scalar is called the conjugate eigenvalue or coneigenvalue of the linear transformation. The coneigenvectors and coneigenvalues represent essentially the same information and meaning as the regular eigenvectors and eigenvalues, but arise when an alternative coordinate system is used. The corresponding equation is
 

For example, in coherent electromagnetic scattering theory, the linear transformation  represents the action performed by the scattering object, and the eigenvectors represent polarization states of the electromagnetic wave. In optics, the coordinate system is defined from the wave's viewpoint, known as the Forward Scattering Alignment (FSA), and gives rise to a regular eigenvalue equation, whereas in radar, the coordinate system is defined from the radar's viewpoint, known as the Back Scattering Alignment (BSA), and gives rise to a coneigenvalue equation.

Generalized eigenvalue problem 
A generalized eigenvalue problem (second sense) is the problem of finding a (nonzero) vector  that obeys
 

The possible values of  must obey the following equation

Then the following equality holds

And the proof is

And since  is invertible, we multiply the equation from the right by its inverse, finishing the proof.

The set of matrices of the form , where  is a complex number, is called a pencil; the term matrix pencil can also refer to the pair  of matrices.

If  is invertible, then the original problem can be written in the form
 

which is a standard eigenvalue problem. However, in most situations it is preferable not to perform the inversion, but rather to solve the generalized eigenvalue problem as stated originally.

In this case, eigenvectors can be chosen so that the matrix  defined above satisfies

and there exists a basis of generalized eigenvectors (it is not a defective problem).  This case is sometimes called a Hermitian definite pencil or definite pencil.

See also 
Eigenvalue perturbation
Frobenius covariant
Householder transformation
Jordan normal form
List of matrices
Matrix decomposition
Singular value decomposition
Sylvester's formula

Notes

References

External links 
 Interactive program & tutorial of Spectral Decomposition.

Matrix theory
Matrix decompositions